The Skyleader GP One is a Czech ultralight aircraft, designed and produced by Skyleader Aircraft and introduced at the AERO Friedrichshafen show in 2010. The aircraft is supplied as a complete ready-to-fly-aircraft.

Design and development
The GP One was designed to comply with the Fédération Aéronautique Internationale microlight rules. It features a cantilever high-wing, a two-seats-in-side-by-side configuration enclosed cockpit accessed by doors, fixed tricycle landing gear and a single engine in tractor configuration.

The standard engine available is the  Rotax 912UL four-stroke powerplant.

Production started in 2011, with the first customer deliveries in 2012.

Specifications (GP One)

References

External links

Photo of a Skyleader GP One

2010s Czech ultralight aircraft
Single-engined tractor aircraft
Skyleader aircraft